REDgroup Retail was the former parent (private equity) company of the Australian and New Zealand divisions of Borders. It also owned other retail entities such as Angus & Robertson in Australia and Whitcoulls in New Zealand.

REDgroup Retail also owned a number of specialty retail stores such as the Pop-up Retail chain, the Calendar Club in Australia and New Zealand along with the Supanews chain.

REDgroup Retail went into administration in 2011. Angus & Robertson and Borders Australia stores were closed or sold; the names and websites were sold to Pearson. Whitcoulls was sold to the James Pascoe Group.

References

Companies based in Melbourne
Defunct retail companies of Australia
Australian subsidiaries of foreign companies
Retail companies disestablished in 2011